HEC Lausanne (standing for Faculté des Hautes études commerciales), also called the Faculty of Business and Economics of the University of Lausanne, is the affiliated business school of the University of Lausanne. Since 1911, HEC Lausanne has been developing teaching and research in the field of business and economics. The school is considered one of the best business schools in Switzerland. HEC Lausanne offers Bachelor, Master, and PhD degrees, as well as executive education, including a part-time Executive MBA, short, open courses, and tailor-made programs for organizations.

History

In 1537, the Academy of Lausanne was founded as a school of theology. In 1890, the Academy of Lausanne received the status of a University; economics was taught within the Faculty of Law. This period was strongly influenced by Léon Walras (1834–1910), the founder of the Lausanne School and creator of the general equilibrium theory. It was also the time of Vilfredo Pareto (1848–1923), the famous author of the concept of Pareto efficiency.

On April 15, 1911, the "Ecole des Hautes Etudes Commerciales" (HEC) was founded by Léon Morf and Georges Paillard within the Faculty of Law. The same year, the school welcomed its 12 first students. Léon Morf, professor of management tools, public accounting, and financial mathematics was its first dean, followed by Georges Paillard.

Over the years, professors like Henri Rieben, founder of the first department of European Integration, François Schaller, President of the Bank Council of the Swiss National Bank from 1986 to 1989, perpetuated the reputation of the school.

Setting
HEC Lausanne is located on the University of Lausanne campus, on the western side of the Lausanne metropolitan area, with direct metro rail access to the center of the city. It overlooks Lake Geneva, a major pool for European industry, banking, trade and research. HEC Lausanne collaborates with the Swiss Finance Institute and the Swiss Federal Institute of Technology (EPFL - Management of Technology program), which are also based on the same campus in Lausanne.

Programs

Undergraduate school 

The three-year cycle has led to the issuance of a Bachelor of Science (BSc) in a chosen specialization. The first two years consist of a common core curriculum in which students learn to master modern management tools and develop their critical thinking. In the third year, students may choose between two specializations: BSc in Management or BSc in Economics.

Graduate school 
HEC Lausanne Masters of Science (MSc) include two to three semesters and a thesis that can be associated with a three- to six- month internship. All Masters can lead to a PhD program. HEC Lausanne offers the following Masters of Science (MSc) degrees: MSc in Accounting Control and Finance, MSc in Actuarial Science, MSc in Information Systems, MSc in Economics, MSc in Finance, MSc in Management and Master in Law and Economics.

Executive MBA 
Since 1979, HEC Lausanne offers an MBA programme designed for managers and professionals who want to evolve or acquire new competences and responsibilities in their career.

The part-time Executive MBA programme lasts 16 months and participants can choose between two focus areas: Management & Corporate Finance and Healthcare Management.

Executive Education - Continuing Education 
HEC Lausanne also offers various programs of Executive Education: 
 Executive Masters (MAS):
 European Sport Governance (MESGO) - in collaboration with 5 academic institutions and universities and 6 leading sports institutions,
 International Taxation - in collaboration with the Faculty of Law, Criminal Sciences & Public Administration,
 Healthcare Management;
 Certificates (CAS) / Diplomas (DAS):
 Strategic Marketing and Communication (CAS/DAS),
 Finance and Accounting (CAS),
 Strategic Risk in Banking (CAS),
 Sport Management (CAS),
 Healthcare Management (CAS);
 Short Programs - Short and open programs, which last from 1 to 8 days in the following fields:
 Marketing and Communication,
 Finance and Accounting,
 Strategic and Financial Risk,
 Strategic leadership;
 Customized Programs - Executive Education platform offers to businesses, organisations, associations and other groups to develop tailor-made training programs specifically designed according to their needs and requirements.
 Affiliated Programs:
 Sport Administration and Technology (MAS) - in collaboration with the AISTS,
 Doing Business in Asia (CAS) - in collaboration with the EPFL,
 Cultural Management (DAS) - in collaboration with the FCUE.

PhD programmes 
HEC Lausanne offers the following doctoral programs (PhD): PhD in Actuarial Science, PhD in Information Systems, PhD in Economics, PhD in Finance, PhD in Management, PhD in History of Economic Thought.

Accreditation and rankings
The Faculty received the AMBA and EQUIS accreditations for the high quality of its programs, research-, and teaching-activities. Through the University of Lausanne, it is also an accredited Swiss university.

Deans 
 2021-     : Marianne Schmid Mast 
 2015-2021 : Jean-Philippe Bonardi
 2012-2015 : Thomas von Ungern-Sternberg
 2009-2012 : Daniel Oyon
 2006-2009 : Suzanne de Treville
 2004-2006 : François Grize
 2000-2004 : Alexander Bergmann
 1990-2000 : Olivier Blanc
 1986-1990 : Francis Léonard
 1977-1986 : Charles Iffland
 1961-1977 : Robert Grosjean
 1936-1961 : Jules Chuard
 1928-1936 : Adolphe Blaser
 1925-1928 : Georges Paillard
 1911-1925 : Léon Morf

Notable people 
 Sepp Blatter, President of FIFA
 Etienne Jornod, Chairman of Galenica and Chairman of NZZ
Louis C. Camilleri, CEO of Ferrari and Chairman of Philip Morris International
Jean-Claude Biver, Chairman of LVMH watch division & CEO of Hublot
 Jacques de Watteville, Chairman of BCV 
 André Borschberg, Professional Pilot, Co-Founder and CEO of Solar Impulse
 Claude Béglé, CEO & Executive Chairman of Symbioswiss
 Thomas Wiesel, humorist
Vincent Hort, General Secretary of Assura
Goetschin Blaise, CEO of BCGE (Banque Cantonale de Genève)
Nicolas Campiche, CEO of Pictet Alternative Investments
Daniel Wanner, CFO of Pictet & Cie
Thierry Kenel, CEO of Swatch Group
Alexandre Zeller, CEO of HSBC Privat Bank Suisse SA and former CEO of BCV (Banque Cantonale Vaudoise)
Hubert Keller, Managing Partner at Lombard Odier
Emmanuel Amoos politician

References

Bibliography 

 L'Ecole des hautes études commerciales: à l'occasion de son XXVe anniversaire: son histoire, son présent, son avenir, Lausanne, Direction de l'école, 1937.
 Cinquantenaire de l'Ecole des hautes études commerciales, Lausanne, Payot, 1962.
 1537-1987: de l'Académie à l'Université de Lausanne, Lausanne, Musée historique de l'Ancien-Evêché, 1987.
 Dictionnaire des professeurs de l'Université de Lausanne dès 1890, Lausanne, Université de Lausanne, 2000.
 Nicole Meystre-Schaeren, "Université de Lausanne en français", Dictionnaire historique de la Suisse (en ligne), 2013.

External links 
 
 HEC Lausanne's research blog

University of Lausanne
Business schools in Switzerland
1911 establishments in Switzerland